uProxy was an extension for Chrome and Firefox, which allowed users to access the Internet via a web proxy. This project has been superseded by Outline VPN. The extension works by enabling a user to share their Internet connection with someone else. Google Ideas provided funding for the development which was carried out by the University of Washington and Brave New Software — the same organization behind the anti-censorship tool Lantern. The extension is intended to allow users to get more secure access to the Internet without being monitored. It is free/libre software under Apache license 2.0. The software has been discontinued, stating on their website " uProxy was an open source project led by the University of Washington and seeded by Jigsaw. Although the project is no longer supported, the code is still available on GitHub."

See also
 Great Firewall of China
 Ultrasurf

References

External links

2013 software
Free Firefox legacy extensions
Google Chrome extensions